The 2022 Nor.Ca. Men's Handball Championship was the third edition of the tournament. It took place in Mexico City at the Mexican Olympic Sports Center from 26 to 30 June 2022.

Preliminary round

Standings

All times are local (UTC−5).

Results

Final round

Third place match

Final

Final standing

References

External links

2022 Men
Nor.Ca. Men's Handball Championship
Nor.Ca. Men's Handball Championship
Nor.Ca. Men's Handball Championship
Nor.Ca.
Sports competitions in Mexico City